Dirk Medved (born 15 September 1968) is a Belgian retired footballer who played as a defender (right or central).

Football career
During his professional career, Genk-born Medved played for K. Waterschei S.V. Thor Genk, K.R.C. Genk, K.A.A. Gent, Club Brugge K.V. – where he was instrumental in the conquest of five domestic trophies, namely the double in 1995–96 – and Standard Liège, totalling 316 games in 14 seasons (ten goals).

He gained 26 caps for Belgium, being chosen for the squad at the 1994 FIFA World Cup, where he played two matches out of four (the national side exited in the round-of-16).

Honours
Belgian League: 1995–96
Belgian Cup: 1994–95, 1995–96; Runner-up 1993–94, 1998–99
Belgian Supercup: 1994, 1996; Runner-up 1995

External links
  
 
 
 

1968 births
Living people
Sportspeople from Genk
Footballers from Limburg (Belgium)
Belgian people of Russian descent
Belgian footballers
Association football defenders
Belgian Pro League players
K. Waterschei S.V. Thor Genk players
K.R.C. Genk players
K.A.A. Gent players
Club Brugge KV players
Standard Liège players
Belgium international footballers
1994 FIFA World Cup players